This is a list of player movements for Super Rugby teams prior to the end of the 2023 Super Rugby Pacific season. Departure and arrivals of all players that were included in a Super Rugby squad for 2022 or 2023 are listed here, regardless of when it occurred. Future-dated transfers are only included if confirmed by the player or his agent, his former team or his new team.
 
Notes
 2022 players listed are all players that were named in the initial senior squad, or subsequently included in a 23-man match day squad at any game during the season.
 (did not play) denotes that a player did not play at all during the season due to injury or non-selection. These players are included to indicate they were contracted to the team.
 (short-term) denotes that a player wasn't initially contracted, but came in during the season. This could either be a club rugby player coming in as injury cover, or a player whose contract had expired at another team (typically in the northern hemisphere).
 (development squad) denotes a player that wasn't named in the original squad, but was announced as signing as a development player. These are often younger players or club players. Different teams use different names for development players. Other names used include (wider training group) or (wider training squad).
 Flags are only shown for players moving to or from another country.
 Players may play in several positions, but are listed in only one.

Brumbies

Force

Rebels

Reds

Waratahs

See also
 
 List of 2022–23 Premiership Rugby transfers
 List of 2022–23 United Rugby Championship transfers
 List of 2022–23 Top 14 transfers
 List of 2022–23 RFU Championship transfers
 List of 2022–23 Rugby Pro D2 transfers
 List of 2022–23 Major League Rugby transfers
 SANZAAR
 Super Rugby franchise areas

References
 

 

 

2021
2022 Super Rugby Pacific season
2023 Super Rugby Pacific season